Girls is the second extended play by South Korean girl group Aespa. The EP was released through SM Entertainment and Warner Records on July 8, 2022. It consists of six tracks and was preceded by the promotional single "Illusion", and two official singles: "Life's Too Short" (English version) and "Girls". The digital version also adds the group's previously released singles "Black Mamba", "Forever", and "Dreams Come True".

Girls was a commercial success and debuted at number one on South Korea's Circle Album Chart with 1,426,487 copies sold in the first week of release, marking Aespa's second number-one album on the chart and their highest-selling album to date. In September, the EP was certified Million by the Korea Music Content Association (KMCA) for surpassing 1,000,000 copies sold. Selling over 1,610,000 units during its pre-order period, the EP became Aespa's best-selling album to date; surpassing a record previously held by Savage (2020). It also debuted at number three on the Billboard 200 with 56,000 album-equivalent units, becoming the group's second and highest entry on the chart.

Background and release 
On June 1, 2022, a teaser marking the release of Aespa's upcoming extended play (EP) was posted on the group's various social media accounts. The teaser was a short video with a "panorama of a digital mountain range" and a "burst of synth-heavy music". It was then announced that the group would release their second EP, titled Girls, on July 8. It was the group's first EP since Savage in October 2021, and their first release since their 2021 remake of the song "Dreams Come True", originally by S.E.S. Girls was released in South Korea and the United States by both SM Entertainment and Warner Records, with whom SM Entertainment signed a global partnership for music content distribution and marketing promotions earlier in the year. In an interview with Billboard, Giselle reiterated that Aespa would travel to the US to promote the EP. Digital and physical pre-sales for the EP opened on June 2.

Aespa was selected as the June artist for Apple Music's Up Next, a global campaign designating the most anticipated artists of the month amongst new artists worldwide. Alongside making pre-orders for Girls available, the group also released a feature short film for Up Next. They released "Illusion" as a pre-release song for the promotions on various music streaming services on June 1, 2022. On June 24, the English version of "Life's Too Short" was released as the EP's second pre-release single. The group debuted the song live at the Coachella Valley Music and Arts Festival.

In an interview with the Audacy, Inc., it was revealed that the release of Girls had been postponed to July 8 from its original date to "make way for more refinements to be made to its songs". On June 24, 2022, in an exclusive interview with Korean media StarNews, the group mentioned that they were wondering if "Lingo" or "Illusion" should be released as a pre-release single. Eventually the members felt the latter fits the album's concept better and has "Aespa's color".

Composition
The standard edition of the mini album is about nineteen minutes long, consisting of 6 tracks, while the digital adds the group's previously released singles "Black Mamba", "Forever", and "Dreams Come True". Girls features various genres such as dance-pop and pop. Lyrically, the album discusses themes of love, self-confidence, friendship, alliance, and more. Rolling Stone'''s Kristine Kwak noted that while "Girls" and "Illusion" are closer to the group's futuristic sound, the rest of the mini album is "more light-hearted side of the girls with themes of not taking life too seriously".

Songs
The lead single "Girls" was described as a "dark", "brooding" dance, pop and electropop song with "heavy bass synth" and lyrics about "Aespa and ae-Aespa having a full-fledged battle with Black Mamba [the antagonist]". It's "glitchy, electronic-heavy production" softens during the bridge, before "sliding into a nutty techno breakdown" at the end. The second track "Illusion" was described as an electronic "high-energy" hip hop, synth-pop, dance and EDM-trap  song with "punchy 808 bass and kicking sound that catches the ears".  It consists of elements indicative of hyperpop, including an "eccentric percussion to hi-hats and electric, woodblock-like clicks". Lyrically, the song was described as having "Aespa's own color expressed" such as "comparing the desire to seduce and devour one's opponent to goblin fire". 

The third track "Lingo" was described as a country dance and dance-pop song with a "reverse charm that combines bass and energetic drums", "Wild West-worthy" harmonica and cowbells. The track celebrates "the special and unique bonds between close friends", expressed through the metaphor of a shared lingo. The fourth track "Life's Too Short" is a medium-tempo pop, soft pop and bubblegum pop song with a "catchy, electric guitar riff" and "bright, breezy and hopeful vocals". The song's lyrics feature a "positive aspiration to enjoy a once-in-a-lifetime life as desired without regrets". The last track "ICU" is a "gentle" and "soothing" acoustic ballad that has a "harmonious"  folk guitar and "delicate" strings. It delivers a message that emphasizes the importance of "making sure to take a step back and rest in the midst of busy times".

Critical reception

Upon its release, Girls received positive responses from music critics, who praised Aespa's  complimented its energy, consistency, and diversity. On Metacritic, which assigns a normalized score out of 100 to ratings from publications, the album received a mean score of 78 based on 5 reviews, indicating "generally favorable reviews".

In a four-star out of five review for Rolling Stone, Kristine Kwak said that it "includes everything one could want from an Aespa record" from heavy synth beats and strong "piercing" vocals to visuals that "don’t give you a second to blink". Writing for AllMusic, Neil Z. Yeung gave Girls a 4 out of 5 rating, citing it as a "edgier and more aggressive than most of their contemporaries". Yeung added that the EP is "brisk nine tracks, there's enough variety and energy to make it an engaging and irresistible listen". For Beats Per Minute, Chase McMullen rated the album 77 out of 100, applauding that album "does exactly what it’s meant to, in exactly the time that it takes to do so". Rhian Daly of NME gave the album a three-star rating, pointing out: "If 'Girls' is a bid for superstar status, though, it sometimes plays it too safe." Clash's critic Robin Murray wrote that the album "demonstrates an advancement of aespa as artists" and "it has solidified the group’s creative intentions whilst also illustrating their ability at owning other concepts".

 Commercial performance 
On June 9, 2022, the pre-orders for Girls surpassed one million copies, a week after the announcement, exceeding Aespa's previous career high of 401,000 pre-orders for Savage. Pre-orders exceeded 1,610,000 units one day prior to its release, the highest figure for a girl group album in K-pop. The album debuted at number one on the Circle Album Chart, selling 1,426,487 copies for the 28th week of 2022. In the first week of release, it was reported that Girls sold more than one million copies on the Hanteo Chart, exceeding the mark set by Blackpink's The Album in October 2020. Girls has since been certified million by the Korea Music Content Association (KMCA). In Japan, it debuted at number 3 on Oricon's Digital Albums Chart and at number 2 on Billboard Japans Hot Albums chart.Girls'' debuted at number three on the US Billboard 200 with 56,000 album-equivalent units, including 53,000 pure album sales, making it the highest-selling album of the week. It was Aespa's first US top-10 album. In Europe, the album appeared on Belgium's Ultratop Flanders 200 Albums, Finland's Top 50 Albums, Hungary's Top 40 Albums, Sweden's Top 20 Physical Albums, Poland's  Top 50 Albums, France's Top 100 Albums, Croatia's International Albums, and the United Kingdom's Album Downloads Chart.

Track listing

Credits and personnel 
Credits adapted from physical album's liner notes (not include the digital edition).

Studio 

 SM Booming System – recording, mixing, engineered for mix, digital editing 
 SM Yellow Tail Studio – recording , digital editing 
 SM Blue Ocean Studio – mixing 
 SM Blue Cup Studio – mixing 
 SM Lvyin Studio – digital editing 
 SM Ssam Studio – recording 
 SM Starlight Studio – recording , digital editing 
 SM Concert Hall Studio – mixing 
 Sonic Korea – mastering 
 821 Sound Mastering – mastering

Personnel 

 SM Entertainment – executive producer
 Lee Soo-man – producer
 Lee Sung-soo – production director, executive supervisor
 Tak Young-jun – executive supervisor
 Aespa – vocals, background vocals 
 Yoo Young-jin – producer , lyrics, composition, arrangement, recording, mixing, engineered for mix, vocal directing, background vocals, digital editing , music and sound supervisor 
 Maxx Song – vocal directing, digital editing 
 Kenzie – vocal directing 
 minGtion – vocal directing 
 Oiaisle – background vocals 
 Emily Yeonseo Kim – vocal directing, background vocals 
 Lee Thor – lyrics 
 Song Jae-ri (Joombas) – lyrics 
 Jang Jeong-won – Korean lyrics 
 Bae Hye-jin (Joombas) – lyrics 
 Becky Hill – English lyrics , composition 
 Uzoechi Emenike – English lyrics , composition 
 Sam Klempner – producer , English lyrics , composition, arrangement 
 Hanif Sabzevari (Hitmanic) – composition, arrangement 
 Dennis "DeKo" Kordnejad (Hitmanic) – composition, arrangement 
 Rodnae "Chikk" Bell – composition 
 Pontus PJ Ljung – composition, arrangement 
 Ryan S. Jhun – producer , composition, arrangement 
 G'harah "PK" Degeddingseze – producer , composition, arrangement 
 Patricia Battani – producer , composition, arrangement 
 Steve Octave – arrangement 
 Alma Goodman – composition, background vocals 
 Gabriella "GiGi" Grombacher – composition, background vocals 
 Christina Galligan – composition, background vocals 
 Lisa "Lixa" Hickox – producer , composition, arrangement 
 Nisha Asnani – composition 
 Josh Cumbee – producer , composition, arrangement, guitar 
 Jay Denton – banjo, mandolin, guitar 
 Noh Min-ji – recording , digital editing 
 Kang Eun-ji – recording 
 Kim Cheol-sun – mixing 
 Jung Eui-seok – mixing 
 Lee Ji-hong – digital editing 
 Jung Yu-ra – recording , digital editing 
 Nam Koong-jin – mixing 
 Jeon Hoon – mastering 
 Shin Soo-min – mastering assistant 
 Kwon Nam-woo – mastering

Charts

Weekly charts

Monthly charts

Year-end charts

Certifications and sales

Release history

References 

2022 EPs
SM Entertainment EPs
Warner Records EPs
Korean-language EPs